The Marianas Cup is an association football competition between neighboring Mariana Islands Guam and the Northern Mariana Islands. Since the first edition in 2007, the tournament has been played between the national teams of varying age groups from the under-12 to senior level. The only exception was the 2013 edition of the tournament in which Guam fielded Quality Distributors, the reigning champions of the Guam Soccer League, against Northern Marianas U19 team in addition to a match between two national sides. Although it is intended as an annual competition, it has been played inconsistently, including hiatuses from 2011 to 2012 and 2014 to 2016.

Winners

Records

References

External links

Guam national football team
Northern Mariana Islands national football team
EAFF competitions
Recurring sporting events established in 2007